Grand Ole Opry's New Star is the debut studio album released by George Jones in November 1956 with Starday Records. Produced by Jones' manager Pappy Daily, the album was recorded during early sessions in 1954, throughout 1955, and other sessions in 1956. It is also the first album to be released on the Starday label, a label only four years old.

Despite its mediocre sound (due in large part to the inadequate sound of Starday recordings), the album has become a huge collector's item. Online sales of original copies have ranged up from $200 to $500. On October 15, 2013, the album was reissued by Reserve Records, with the first 250 copies cut on blue vinyl and included a rare 45 of Jones' "Thumper Jones" releases.

Background
Starday Records was an independent record label in Houston that was co-founded by Jones's producer and mentor H. W. "Pappy" Daily and Jack Starnes. Jones's  first recording, the self-penned novelty "No Money in This Deal", had appeared in February 1954 and in 1955 he scored his first hit with "Why Baby Why", which would be the lead track on Grand Ole Opry's New Star.  The title reflected Jones's 1956 appearance on the Grand Ole Opry, which solidified his emerging status in the country music world. Extant copies of Grand Ole Opry's New Star are rare, and collector's prices are $400 and up.

Recording and composition
Jones wrote or co-wrote all fourteen songs on the album, which included three of his early top-10 country hits: "Why Baby Why", "What Am I Worth", and "You Gotta Be My Baby". The singer had performed "You Gotta Be My Baby" during his first appearance on the Grand Ole Opry in 1956.  The first three songs written for the album, "Play It Cool", "Hold Everything", and "Boat of Life", were recorded between January and August 1954 at Starnes's Studio in Beaumont, Texas; the remainder of the songs were recorded in Houston at Gold Star Studio between March 1955 and August 1956.
Why Baby, Why
Jones's first chart hit, "Why Baby Why", has gone on to become a country standard, having been covered by Red Sovine and Webb Pierce (a number one duet in 1956), Hank Locklin (1956), Charley Pride (another number one in 1983), Waylon Jennings and Willie Nelson (1983), Palomino Road (1992) and Patty Loveless (2008).  In the liner notes to the retrospective Cup Of Loneliness: The Classic Mercury Years, country music historian Colin Escott observes that part of the song's appeal "lay in the way a Cajun dance number was trying to break free of a honky tonk song."  Jones recorded the backing vocal himself, with help from innovative techniques from engineer Bill Quinn, after a planned appearance by more established singer Sonny Burns did not materialize due to the latter's drinking. According to the book George Jones: The Life and Times of a Honky Tonk Legend, Jones's frequent songwriting partner Darrell Edwards was inspired to write the words after hearing an argument between a couple at a gas station.

Jones and Edwards also collaborated on "Seasons Of My Heart", which would go on to be a hit for Johnny Cash and was also recorded by Jerry Lee Lewis and Willie Nelson.  Former Starday president Don Pierce later explained to Jones biographer Bob Allen that "Pappy realized George's strength as a balladeer long before I did.  He felt that 'Seasons Of My Heart' was a big song.  I knew that, in those days, it took much longer to sell a ballad, because it had to make it on the radio first...I also knew that an upbeat song like 'Why, Baby Why' would be easier to sell directly to the jukebox distributors for the beer-drinkin' trade." 
Ragged But Right & Yearning
"I'm Ragged But I'm Right" is a defiant statement of blue collar pride that actually dates back to a 1929 blues record by the Blue Harmony Boys.  It was later cut by stringband veteran Riley Puckett in 1934 but, as Colin Escott speculated in 1994, "George probably picked it up from the Gulf Coast legend Moon Mullican, who played the same spots."  The song would remain a favorite of Jones's, who would rerecord it several times (the last being for his 1983 album You've Still Got A Place In My Heart).  Grand Ole Opry's New Star also features the ballad "Yearning" with Jeanette Hicks, the first of countless duets Jones would record over his long career which would cement his place as one of country music's greatest harmony singers.

Sound quality
In later years, Jones would have little good to say about the music production at Starday, recalling to NPR in 1996 that "it was a terrible sound. We recorded in a small living room of a house on a highway near Beaumont. You could hear the trucks. We had to stop a lot of times because it wasn't soundproof, it was just egg crates nailed on the wall and the big old semi trucks would go by and make a lot of noise and we'd have to start over again." In 2013, Grand Ole Opry's New Star was reissued for the first time. The first 250 copies of this album were pressed on blue vinyl and came with a bonus reissue of Jones's only rockabilly record, an ultra-rare 45 rpm he cut under the name "Thumper Jones" in the wake of Elvis Presley's explosion in popularity in 1956. In his autobiography the singer joked, "During the years, when I've encountered those records, I've used them for Frisbees."  However, as Nick Tosches notes in his 1994 Texas Monthly article "The Devil in George Jones", "Though Jones would never acknowledge it, the rockabilly impulse of the early fifties had affected his sound as much as the lingering voices of Acuff and Williams. 'Play It Cool, Man, Play It Cool,' recorded by Jones in 1954, several months before Elvis's debut, had bordered on pure rockabilly..."  In the 1989 Jones documentary Same Ole Me, Johnny Cash insisted, "George Jones woulda been a really hot rockabilly artist if he'd approached it from that angle. Well, he was, really, but never got the credit for it."
"What Am I Worth" was covered by Sammy Kershaw on 1991's Don't Go Near the Water.

Track listing

All songs by George Jones unless otherwise noted. As listed on the cover and record label:

References

1956 debut albums
George Jones albums
Starday Records albums
Albums produced by Pappy Daily
Albums recorded at Gold Star Studios